Mother! (stylized as mother!) is a 2017 American psychological horror film written and directed by Darren Aronofsky, and starring Jennifer Lawrence, Javier Bardem, Ed Harris, Michelle Pfeiffer, Domhnall Gleeson, Brian Gleeson, and Kristen Wiig. It follows a young woman whose tranquil life with her husband at their country home is disrupted by the arrival of a mysterious couple.

The film premiered on September 5, 2017, at the 74th Venice International Film Festival, where it was selected to compete for the Golden Lion. It was released in the United States on September 15, 2017, by Paramount Pictures, and grossed $44 million worldwide against its $30 million budget. Although it received generally positive reviews, its biblical allegories and depiction of violence sparked controversy.

Plot
In the burned-out remains of a large house, Him, an acclaimed poet struggling with writer's block, places a crystal object on a pedestal in his study, and the building morphs into a beautiful home in an edenic landscape. Mother, the poet's wife and muse, awakens in her bed and wonders aloud where Him is. While renovating the house, she occasionally visualizes a beating heart within its walls.

One day, a stranger called Man turns up at the house, asking for a room and claiming to be a local doctor. Him readily agrees, and Mother reluctantly follows suit. Late that night, Man suffers from dry heaves and Mother observes a wound on his side.

Man's wife, Woman, arrives the next day. Mother is increasingly frustrated by her guests, but Him begs her to let them stay, revealing that Man is actually a fan whose dying wish was to meet Him. However, when Man and Woman accidentally shatter the crystal object, which Him had forbidden them to touch, Him becomes angry and boards up his study. Mother tells Man and Woman to leave, but, before they can go, their two sons arrive unexpectedly and fight over Man's will. The oldest son, who is concerned about his impending inheritance, argues and fights with his younger brother, severely wounding him, and the older brother flees after having his head smashed against glass by Him, leaving a bloody gash in his head.

Him, Man, and Woman take the injured son to the hospital. Alone in the house, Mother cleans up and follows a trail of blood to a tank of heating oil hidden behind the basement walls. Upon returning, Him informs Mother the son has died.

Mother and Him are roused that night when dozens of people arrive unannounced at the house to mourn the dead son. The visitors behave in rude and presumptuous ways that irritate Mother, and she snaps and orders everyone to leave when they break a sink, partially flooding the house. She berates Him for allowing so many people inside and ignoring her needs, but their argument leads to passionate lovemaking. The next morning, Mother announces she is pregnant, which elates Him and inspires him to start writing again.

Time passes. Mother prepares for the arrival of the child and reads Him's beautiful new poem. Upon publication, it is acclaimed and sells well. In celebration, Mother prepares a big dinner, but a group of fans interrupt. Though she asks Him to send them away, he insists he has to be polite and show his appreciation. Mother tries to lock the doors, but droves of fans pour into the house and begin to wreak havoc, stealing things as souvenirs and damaging the house. Due to the adulation he is receiving, Him is oblivious to what is happening, but a disoriented Mother watches helplessly as military forces turn up to battle members of the cult that has sprung up around Him and as his publicist organizes mass executions. Mother goes into labor and finds Him, who reopens his study, which he had previously boarded up, so she can give birth inside.

The havoc outside subsides. Him tells Mother his fans want to see Their newborn son, but she refuses to hand over the boy. Eventually, she falls asleep, and Him takes the child outside to the crowd, which passes the baby around wildly until he is inadvertently killed. Mother wades into the throng and finds people eating her son's mutilated corpse. Furious, she calls them murderers and attacks them with a shard of glass. They turn on her and beat her savagely until Him intervenes. He begs Mother to forgive them, but she runs down to the basement oil tank and punctures it with a wrench. She ignites the oil, causing an explosion that incinerates the crowd and destroys the house.

Him is unscathed by the inferno, but Mother is horrifically burned. She asks him what he is, and he replies, "I am I" and Mother was "home." He asks for her love, and, when she agrees, reaches into her chest and removes her heart, which he tears open to reveal a new crystal object. He places it on the pedestal and the house is transformed back into a beautiful home. A new Mother appears in the bed and awakens, wondering aloud where Him is.

Cast

Themes

In an interview, Lawrence stated that the film is an allegory and "depicts the rape and torment of Mother Earth ... I represent Mother Earth; Javier, whose character is a poet, represents a form of God, a creator; Michelle Pfeiffer is an Eve to Ed Harris's Adam, there's Cain and Abel and the setting sometimes resembles the Garden of Eden".

Aronofsky said the exclamation mark in the title "reflects the spirit of the film", which ends with "a big exclamation point". He discussed the film's unusual choice of not capitalizing the letter 'm' in the title during a Reddit interview, saying: "To find out why there's a lowercase 'm', read the credits and look for the letter that is capitalised. Ask yourself what's another name for this character?" (In the credits, the characters' names are all shown in lowercase, except for Him.)

The lighter that appears throughout the film bears the Wendehorn, a runic symbol that represents "the cooperation between nature's eternal laws, working in effect and in accordance with each other." One of the film's unexplained elements is the yellow powder that Lawrence's character drinks, which The Daily Beast suggests is a reference to Charlotte Perkins Gilman's short story "The Yellow Wallpaper".

Production

Development
After 2014's Noah, Aronofsky began working on a children's film. During that process, he came up with a new idea. He ended up writing the screenplay for Mother! in five days, much faster than his usual pace. The film uses a dream-logic narrative, of which Aronofsky has noted: "if you try to unscrew it, it kind of falls apart ... it's a psychological freak-out. You shouldn't over-explain it."

Casting
Jennifer Lawrence was reportedly in talks to join the film by October 2015 and, by January 2016, Javier Bardem was also in talks to star. In March, it was announced Kristen Wiig had been cast in the film and, by April, Domhnall Gleeson, Michelle Pfeiffer, Ed Harris, and Brian Gleeson were added to the cast.

Filming
Principal photography began on June 13, 2016, and concluded on August 28, 2016. The cast first rehearsed for three months in a warehouse, during which time Aronofsky was able to "get a sense of movement and camera movement, and learn from that." Lawrence was reportedly quite relaxed through rehearsals; Aronofsky said that he "didn't get to know the character until we started shooting, and she showed up."

Music

Mother! was the first of Aronofsky's films without the involvement of composer Clint Mansell. It initially had a score composed by Jóhann Jóhannsson, but after seeing the 90-minute score synced up with a rough cut of the film, Aronofsky and Jóhannsson agreed not to use it. They tried using the score at only a few moments, then a minimal version of the score with sound design by Craig Henighan, incorporating noises into the soundscape of the house. They ultimately decided the film worked best with no music. Composer Ólafur Arnalds recounted the following story about this decision:

Over the closing credits, the film features a cover of Skeeter Davis's "The End of the World" performed by Patti Smith.

Release

The film was originally scheduled to be released on October 13, 2017, but was moved up to September 15. It had its world premiere at the 74th Venice International Film Festival, where it was selected to compete for the Golden Lion; premiered in London on September 6, 2017; and was screened at the 2017 Toronto International Film Festival.

On August 7, 2017, the first official trailer for the film was released.

Home media
Mother! was released digitally on December 5, 2017, and was released on Ultra HD Blu-ray, Blu-ray, and DVD on December 19. It is available to stream on Paramount+.

Reception

Box office
The film grossed $17.8 million in the United States and Canada and $26.7 million in other territories for a worldwide total of $44.5 million, against a production budget of $30 million.

In North America, the film was released alongside American Assassin and was projected to gross $12–14 million from 2,368 theaters in its opening weekend. It made $700,000 from Thursday night previews, $3.1 million on its first day, and went on to open to just $7.5 million, finishing third at the box office and marking the worst debut for a film in which Lawrence had top billing. Deadline Hollywood attributed the film's underperformance to its controversial narrative, misleading advertisements, and "F" CinemaScore grade (it is one of only 22 films to receive such a rating). Other publications wrote that the film's CinemaScore grade, which is extremely rare, is typically associated with "a movie that goes out of its way to artfully alienate or confuse audiences." In its second weekend, the film dropped 56.3% to $3.3 million, finishing sixth at the box office.

Aronofsky responded to the film's CinemaScore rating by saying that Mother! was meant to be difficult viewing for audiences: "How if you walk out of this movie are you not going to give it an 'F'? ... We wanted to make a punk movie and come at you. And the reason I wanted to come is because I was very sad and I had a lot of anguish and I wanted to express it."

Critical response
Mother! received generally positive reviews from critics, who praised Aronofsky's direction and the performances, particularly those of Lawrence and Pfeiffer, while its biblical allegories and depiction of violence sparked controversy. On review aggregator Rotten Tomatoes, the film holds an approval rating of 68% based on 379 reviews, with an average rating of 7/10; the website's critical consensus reads: "There's no denying that Mother! is the thought-provoking product of a singularly ambitious artistic vision, though it may be too unwieldy for mainstream tastes." On Metacritic, the film has a weighted average score of 75 out of 100, based on reviews from 51 critics, indicating "generally favorable reviews". The film received both boos and a standing ovation during its premiere at the Venice Film Festival.  Audiences polled by CinemaScore gave the film a rare average grade of "F" on an A+ to F scale, making it one of twenty-two films to receive the score, while PostTrak reported filmgoers gave a 51% overall positive and a 33% "definite recommend".

Owen Gleiberman of Variety, in a positive review of the film, called Mother! "a piece of ersatz humanity", and wrote: "By all means, go to Mother! and enjoy its roller-coaster-of-weird exhibitionism. But be afraid, very afraid, only if you're hoping to see a movie that's as honestly disquieting as it is showy." Peter Travers of Rolling Stone awarded the film three and a half out of four stars, describing it and Aronofsky's direction as an "artist's cry from his own corrupt heart" and "a work of a visionary". He also praised the film's allegorical narrative and the performances of Lawrence, Bardem, and Pfeiffer, and said, positively, that the cinematography "always seems on the verge of exploding". Writing for the Chicago Tribune, Michael Phillips said: "Darren Aronofsky delivers a damning critique of the artist/muse arrangement, even as he admits to its old-fashioned patriarchal simplicity." He also referred to the film and its script as "grandiose and narcissistic and, in quick strokes, pretty vicious," while drawing a similarity to Aronofsky's film Black Swan.

Writing for The Guardian, Peter Bradshaw gave the film five stars, saying: "Darren Aronofsky's toweringly outrageous film leaves no gob unsmacked. It is an event-movie detonation, a phantasmagorical horror and black-comic nightmare that jams the narcosis needle right into your abdomen." Ignatiy Vishnevetsky of The A.V. Club gave the film a B+, writing: "the filmmaking ranks as some of Aronofsky's most skillful". Ben Croll of IndieWire gave the film an A−, noting: "Awash in both religious and contemporary political imagery, Darren Aronofsky's allusive film opens itself to a number of allegorical readings, but it also works as a straight-ahead head rush." In an essay for The Hollywood Reporter, Martin Scorsese said: "It was so tactile, so beautifully staged and acted—the subjective camera and the POV reverse angles, always in motion ... the sound design, which comes at the viewer from around corners and leads you deeper and deeper into the nightmare ... the unfolding of the story, which very gradually becomes more and more upsetting as the film goes forward. The horror, the dark comedy, the biblical elements, the cautionary fable—they're all there, but they're elements in the total experience, which engulfs the characters and the viewers along with them. Only a true, passionate filmmaker could have made this picture, which I'm still experiencing weeks after I saw it." Director William Friedkin praised the film.

Rex Reed gave the film zero stars in The New York Observer, and wrote that, despite some good cinematography, "Nothing about Mother! makes one lick of sense as Darren Aronofsky's corny vision of madness turns more hilarious than scary. With so much crap around to clog the drain, I hesitate to label it the 'Worst movie of the year' when 'Worst movie of the century' fits it even better." Reed further dismissed other critics' positive reviews of the film as "equally pretentious" and "even nuttier than the film itself. ... they all insist Mother! is a metaphor for something, although they are not quite sure what it is." Similarly, The New Republics Jo Livingstone stated that the film has "no human center to hold it down." Anthony Lane wrote in his review in New Yorker that "My patience was tested beyond repair, I am afraid, by the nimbus of nonsense." In The Wall Street Journal, John Anderson said: "it achieves a level of excess that makes the whole enterprise increasingly cartoonish, rather than just awful." Richard Roeper of the Chicago Sun-Times rated the film two out of four stars, writing that, while he appreciated Lawrence's performance, he questioned whether Aronofsky was mocking certain biblical passages featured in the film or presenting a commentary on an artistic process. Writing for The Washington Post, Anne Hornaday gave the film two stars, saying: "Even Lawrence's magnetic powers can't keep Mother! from going off the rails, which at first occurs cumulatively, then in a mad rush during the film's outlandish climax."

Stephen Whitty of the Newark Star Ledger wrote: "one part early Roman Polanski, one part pseudo Harold Pinter, and two parts apology-from-a-driven-artist. And none of it adds up. The feeble idea behind Mother! isn't strong enough to bear the weight of all the overwrought style he hangs on it. Unlike the mansion it's set in, it's a small, hammered-together thing, and it can't bear all this meaning and metaphor." Chris Nashawaty of Entertainment Weekly said: "Darren Aronofsky's Mother! is Rosemary's Baby amped up into a fugue state of self-indulgent solipsism. He's an artist. And he really wants you to know that he's been thinking a lot about what that means. Unfortunately, his gaze is so deep into his own navel that it's just exasperating." David Edelstein of New York magazine shrugged off the film and any talk of its craft, writing: "Most of the dialogue and effects are clunky, repetitive, second rate."

Accolades
The film's nominations at the 38th Golden Raspberry Awards received backlash from audiences and critics, especially Lawrence's nomination, whose performance was praised by critics.

Notes

References

External links

 
 
 
 

2017 films
2017 horror thriller films
2017 psychological thriller films
2017 thriller drama films
2010s horror drama films
2010s pregnancy films
2010s psychological drama films
2010s psychological horror films
Allegory
American horror drama films
American horror thriller films
American pregnancy films
American psychological drama films
American psychological horror films
American psychological thriller films
American thriller drama films
Cultural depictions of Adam and Eve
2010s English-language films
Films about cannibalism
Films about child death
Films about poets
Films directed by Darren Aronofsky
Films set in country houses
Films shot in Montreal
Films with screenplays by Darren Aronofsky
Fratricide in fiction
Fiction about God
Metaphysical fiction films
Fiction about human sacrifice
Paramount Pictures films
Protozoa Pictures films
Religious horror films
2010s American films
Films without soundtracks